Al-Hasakah, is the capital city of the Al-Hasakah Governorate, in the northeastern corner of Syria. With a 2004 census population of 188,160, it is the eighth most-populous city in Syria and the largest in Al-Hasakah Governorate. It is the administrative center of a Nahiyah ("subdistrict") consisting of 108 localities with a combined population of 251,570 in 2004. Al-Hasakah is predominantly populated by Arabs with large numbers of Kurds, Aramean Syriacs and a smaller number of Armenians.

The Khabur River, a tributary of the Euphrates River, flows west–east through the city. The Jaghjagh River flows into the Khabur from the north at Al-Hasakah. A portion of the city is a Syrian government-controlled enclave, comprising the city center and various government buildings, with the rest of the city (and the surrounding countryside) controlled by the AANES.

History

An ancient tell has been identified in the city centre by Dominique Charpin as the location of the city of Qirdahat. Another possibility is that it was the site of the ancient Aramean city of Magarisu, mentioned by the Assyrian king Ashur-bel-kala, who fought the Arameans near the city. The etymology of "Magarisu" is Aramaic (from the root mgrys) and means "pasture land". The city was the capital of the Aramean state of Bit-Yahiri, which was invaded by Assyrian kings Tukulti-Ninurta II and Ashurnasirpal II.

Excavations in the tell discovered materials dating to the Middle-Assyrian, Byzantine and Islamic eras. The last level of occupation ended in the fifteenth century. A period of 1,500 years separated the Middle-Assyrian and Byzantine levels.

There are numerous other archaeological tells in the surrounding area, such as Tall Sulaymānī, which is 7.6 kilometers to the north of the city.

In Ottoman times, the town was insignificant. Today's settlement was established in April 1922 as a French military post, which soon grew into a town. The establishment of new cities in northern Syria was deemed necessary by the authorities of the French Mandate because after the foundation of Turkey, all major economic centers were allocated to Turkey. After the Armenian genocide and Assyrian/Syriac genocide in the Ottoman Empire, many refugees fled to the area after their expulsion and began to develop it in the 1920s.

During the French mandate period, Assyrians fleeing ethnic cleansing in Iraq during the Simele massacre, established numerous villages along the Khabur River during the 1930s. French troops were stationed on Citadel Hill at that time. In 1942, there were 7,835 inhabitants in Al-Hasakah, several schools, two churches and a gas station. The new city grew from the 1950s to become the administrative center of the region. The economic boom in the cities of Qamishli and Al-Hasakah was a result of the irrigation projects started in the 1960s, which transformed northeastern Syria into a cotton-growing area.

On 23 March 1993, a large fire broke out in the Al-Hasakah Central Prison after prisoners protested the conditions there, leaving 61 inmates dead and 90 others injured. The detainees accused the police chief and the Syrian forces of having set the fire. The government blamed five inmates, who were then executed on 24 May 1993.

Civil war 

On 26 January 2011, in one of the first events of the 2011 Syrian protests, Hasan Ali Akleh from Al-Hasakah poured gasoline on himself and set himself on fire, in the same way Tunisian Mohamed Bouazizi had in Tunis on 17 December 2010. According to eyewitnesses, the action was "a protest against the Syrian government".

In the Battle of Hasakah of summer 2015, the Syrian Government lost control of much of the city to the Islamic State, which was then captured by the YPG. Afterwards, some 75% of Hasakah and all of the surrounding countryside were under the administration of the Federation of Northern Syria – Rojava, while only some inner-city areas were controlled by the Syrian government. The United Nations estimates that violence related to the civil War has displaced up to 120,000 people. On 1 August 2016, the Syrian Democratic Council opened a public office in Al-Hasakah.

On 16 August 2016, the Battle of al-Hasakah (2016) started, with the YPG and Asayish capturing most of the remaining areas held by government forces. On 23 August 2016, an agreement between the YPG and the Syrian Army resulted in a ceasefire within the city. Al-Hasakah has since been part of the Jazira Region in the framework of the de facto autonomous Federation of Northern Syria – Rojava.

In January 2021, Al-Hasakh, along with Qamishli, came under siege by the Asayish due to disputes with the Damascus government.

On 20 January 2022, the al-Sina'a prison came under attack by Islamic State forces who attempted to free ex-IS fighters that were incarcerated inside the prison. Following the initial attack, clashes spread to the neighbourhoods of al-Zuhour and Ghuwayran. After a 6-day battle, SDF and Coalition forces managed to push back the attack and secure the area. After thwarting their attack on Ghweran prison, they barricaded themselves in the Faculty of Economics building in the Syrian government-controlled areas in the city of Hasaka, targeting civilians and the movements of the internal security forces' vehicles. Accordingly, international coalition warplanes bombed the college building.

Hasakah Security Box 
The Hasakah Security Box is a Syrian government enclave within Al-Hasakah, established in August 2016. It contains the prison, immigration office, mayor's palace, police headquarters, and local army command center.

Following the second battle for the city in 2015, the Syrian government controlled 25% of the city while Rojava controlled 75%.
On August 16, 2016, a small skirmish erupted into the third Battle of al-Hasakah between Asayish alongside YPG and the Syrian government for al-Hasakah. After a week-long battle, Kurdish fighters secured control over 95% of the city.

Russia mediated a ceasefire that was put into place on August 23, 2016. Only civilian police officers and interior ministry forces were allowed to return to the Security Box to protect the government's department buildings. In July 2018, the Syrian Army raised the Syrian flag over the Al-Nashwa District that previously was controlled by the YPG and the Asayish security forces in the city of Hasakah. However, in September through November 2019, Asayish forces were still present in al-Nashwa district and able to make arrests.

Climate
Al-Hasakah has a Mediterranean-influenced semi-arid climate (BSh) with very hot dry summers and cool wet winters with occasional frosty nights.

Demographics

In 1939, French mandate authorities reported the following population numbers for different ethnic/religious groups in al-Hasakah city centre:

In 1992, Al-Hasakah was described as "an Arab city with a growing Kurdish population." Christians—mostly Arameans, plus a smaller number of Armenians—also live in the city.
In 2004, the city's population was 188,160. Al-Hasakah has an ethnically diverse population of Arabs, Kurds and Arameans, with a smaller number of Armenians.

Religion
There are more than forty mosques in the city, as well as at least nine church buildings, serving a large number of Christians of various rites. The Cathedral of the Assumption of Mary is the episcopal see of the non-metropolitan Syriac Catholic Archeparchy of Al Hasakah-Nisibis, which depends directly on the Syriac Catholic Patriarch of Antioch.

Churches in the city
 Syriac Orthodox Cathedral of Saint George (كاتدرائية مار جرجس للسريان الأرثوذكس)
 Syriac Orthodox Church of Our Lady (كنيسة السيدة العذراء للسريان الأرثوذكس)
 Syriac Catholic Church of Our Lady of the Assumption (كنيسة سيدة الإنتقال للسريان الكاثوليك)
 Assyrian Church of Our Lady (كنيسة السيدة العذراء للآشوريين)
 Chaldean Catholic Church of Jesus the King (كنيسة يسوع الملك للكلدان الكاثوليك)
 Armenian Orthodox Church of Saint John the Baptist (كنيسة القديس مار يوحنا المعمدان للأرمن الأرثوذكس)
 Armenian Catholic Church of the Holy Family (كنيسة العائلة المقدسة للأرمن الكاثوليك)
 National Evangelical Presbyterian Church (الكنيسة الإنجيلية المشيخية الوطنية)
 Jesus The Light of the World National Evangelical Church (كنيسة الاتحاد المسيحي يسوع نور العالم)

Districts
The city of Al-Hasakah is divided into 5 districts, which are Al-Madinah, Al-Aziziyah, Ghuwayran, Al-Nasra and Al-Nashwa. These districts, in turn, are divided into 29 neighborhoods.

Sports

Al-Jazeera SC Hasakah is the largest football club in the city and plays at Bassel al-Assad Stadium.

Gallery

Notable people 
 Hammouda Sabbagh, politician
 Ignatius Joseph III Yonan;  the Syriac Catholic Patriarch of Antioch

See also
Syriac Catholic Archeparchy of Al Hasakah-Nisibis

Notes

References

Citations

Works cited 
 

 
Cities in Syria
Populated places in al-Hasakah District
Christian communities in Syria
Assyrian communities in Syria
Armenian communities in Syria
Kurdish communities in Syria
Upper Mesopotamia